Events in the year 1988 in Bulgaria.

Incumbents 

 General Secretaries of the Bulgarian Communist Party: Todor Zhivkov
 Chairmen of the Council of Ministers: Georgi Atanasov

Events 

 December 27 – Bulgaria gets rid of its ban on Radio Free Europe.

Births 
 28 January - Marin Yonchev, tenor

Deaths

References 

 
1980s in Bulgaria
Years of the 20th century in Bulgaria
Bulgaria
Bulgaria